Chow Kon Yeow (born 14 November 1958) is a Malaysian politician who has served as 5th Chief Minister of Penang since May 2018, Member of the Penang State Legislative Assembly (MLA) for Padang Kota since March 2008 and Member of Parliament (MP) for Tanjong from November 1999 to May 2013 and again from May 2018 to November 2022. He is a member, National Vice Chairman and State Chairman of Penang of the Democratic Action Party (DAP), a component party of the Pakatan Harapan (PH) coalition governing the state.

Political career 
He had served as Member of the Penang State Executive Council (EXCO) in the Pakatan Rakyat (PR) and Pakatan Harapan (PH) state administrations under former Chief Minister Lim Guan Eng from March 2008 to his promotion to Chief Ministership in May 2018. He is also the MLA of Penang for Pengkalan Kota from October 1990 to April 1995.

Appointment as National Vice Chairman 
On 20 March 2022, on the 17th DAP National Congress, Chow was re-elected into the Central Executive Committee with 1641 votes, the 2nd highest vote, after Gobind Singh. He was then re-appointed as the Vice National Chairman under Lim Guan Eng.

Personal life
Chow was born on 14 November 1957 in Kuala Lumpur, Malaysia. He holds a Bachelor in Social Sciences (Hons) degree from University of Science Malaysia (USM). Before entering politics, Chow was a journalist by profession.

Chow married Tan Lean Kee and the couple has two sons.

He tested positive for Covid-19 on 1 November 2022.

Election results

References

External links
 
 Profile on the Parliament website

Living people
1957 births
People from Selangor
Malaysian politicians of Chinese descent
Malaysian journalists
Democratic Action Party (Malaysia) politicians
Members of the Penang State Legislative Assembly
Chief Ministers of Penang
Penang state executive councillors
Members of the Dewan Rakyat
21st-century Malaysian politicians